Jung Hyun-young (born September 12, 2005) is a South Korean swimmer.

Career
In July 2021, she represented South Korea at the 2020 Summer Olympics held in Tokyo, Japan. She competed in 4 × 200m freestyle relay event. The team did not advance to compete in the final.

References

External links
 

2005 births
Living people
South Korean female freestyle swimmers
Swimmers at the 2020 Summer Olympics
Olympic swimmers of South Korea
People from Geoje
Sportspeople from South Gyeongsang Province
21st-century South Korean women